Gunnar Dahlen (28 April 1918 – 21 May 2004) was a Norwegian football player. He was born in Verdal, and played for the sports club SK Freidig. He played for the Norwegian national team at the 1952 Summer Olympics in Helsinki. He was capped 19 times, scoring four goals, for Norway between 1947 and 1952.

References

External links

1918 births
2004 deaths
People from Verdal
Norwegian footballers
Norway international footballers
Footballers at the 1952 Summer Olympics
Olympic footballers of Norway
Association football forwards
Sportspeople from Trøndelag